Kentish Town West railway station, on the North London line, is in Prince of Wales Road in the London Borough of Camden. It is in Travelcard Zone 2. The station and all trains serving it are operated by London Overground.

History
The station opened on 1 April 1867 as "Kentish Town", was renamed "Kentish Town West" on 2 June 1924, and no trains called after a serious fire on 18 April 1971. In 1976, British Rail began the procedure for its permanent closure. If no objections were received by 19 November 1976, the station would be deemed closed from Monday 20 December 1976. Despite this announcement, the station was rebuilt and re-opened on 5 October 1981. It was officially opened by Ken Livingstone, Leader of the Greater London Council. The £400,000 cost of rebuilding had been financed entirely by the GLC. The new station consisted of a booking hall and ticket office, plus waiting shelters on the platforms.

After the reopening the work continued until May 2011 with a reduced service and none on Sundays.

Services
The station is managed by London Overground, which also operates all services from the station. The basic weekday service is eight trains per hour in each direction, calling at every station. Four are Richmond to Stratford North London line services, alternating with four West London line services between Clapham Junction and Stratford.

Services are formed of  Capitalstar electric multiple units, which replaced the older  EMUs.

Connections
London Buses routes 46 and 393 serve the station.

See also
 Kentish Town station, on the Northern line and Thameslink.

References

External links

 Excel file displaying National Rail station usage information for 2005/06

Railway stations in the London Borough of Camden
Former London and North Western Railway stations
Railway stations in Great Britain opened in 1867
Railway stations in Great Britain closed in 1971
Railway stations in Great Britain opened in 1981
Railway stations served by London Overground
Kentish Town